Siege is an American comic book, published by Marvel Comics from January to May 2010. It deals with the climax of the "Dark Reign" storyline, which saw Norman Osborn become the United States primary defense officer, leading H.A.M.M.E.R. as well as employing his own evil Avengers. The story depicts Loki manipulating Osborn into leading an all-out assault on Asgard, at the time located within the United States. Captain America and his own Avengers lead a rebellion against Osborn. The events in Siege led to Marvel Comics introducing the subsequent storyline "Heroic Age".

Publication history

"Siege"' consists of an eponymous four-issue mini-series, and a number of related tie-in books, including one-shots, miniseries, and existing ongoing series.

Marvel announced in early 2010 that the company's "Siege" storyline would be followed by the "Heroic Age" story-line. This was first hinted at in the story by Athena to Amadeus Cho.

Publication aftermath
The end was described as what would be the start of a new "Heroic Age" in the Marvel Universe.

The final tie-in issues of the four Avengers titles, Mighty Avengers #36, New Avengers #64, Dark Avengers #16 and Avengers: The Initiative #35 were the last ones of those series, along with a New Avengers: Finale one-shot, with illustrations by Bryan Hitch.

From June 2010 Marvel published Avengers Prime: Siege Aftermath. This five-part series focused on Thor, Iron Man, and Captain America and bridged the gap between "Siege" and "Heroic Age".

Though not badged as an aftermath series, a limited series starting in May 2010 examined the fall of Norman Osborn and examine the effects upon his son Harry Osborn. The series was titled Amazing Spider-Man Presents: American Son.

Plot
Norman Osborn calls a meeting of the super-villain Cabal, consisting of Doctor Doom, the Hood, the Taskmaster and the Asgardian God Loki, to discuss Asgard (the home of the Norse gods), which is now hovering above Broxton, Oklahoma, and the last holdout in Osborn's consolidation of power. A rift develops between Doom and Osborn, creating mayhem that appears to get rid of the group. Later, under his pretence of respectability, Osborn attempts in vain to secure permission from the President of the United States to invade Asgard claiming it poses a national security threat. On Loki's advice, Osborn engineers a tragedy in which the hapless Asgardian Volstagg, manipulated into battling the super-villain team the U-Foes, accidentally causes an explosion that kills everyone in a crowded Soldier Field football stadium in Chicago, Illinois. This gives Osborn the justification to lay siege on Asgard with military troops as well as with the Dark Avengers — his team of super-villains posing as superheroes and with loyalists planted amid the various 50-State Initiative teams of heroes. Osborn's aide-de-camp, Victoria Hand suggests unsuccessfully that Osborn seek therapy for his instability. Shortly afterward, the President realizes that Osborn is unstable and orders Hand to produce him.

In the meantime, in order to better control the highly powerful but psychologically fragile superhero the Sentry, who has allowed himself to be under Osborn's care, Osborn has the villainous Bullseye kill the Sentry's wife, Lindy Reynolds. He then claims that she committed suicide. Concurrently, Loki prepares Asgard for invasion through selective assassination and by neutralizing Heimdall, the city's guardian.

The siege begins with the Sentry attacking Asgard, followed by a massive aerial assault led by Osborn in his Iron Patriot armor. The Asgardian Thunder-God Thor, who has been banished from Asgard for some time, is stunned and falls in battle. With the attack on Asgard instantly becoming a major news story, Steve Rogers, the erstwhile Captain America, assembles a group of legitimate Avengers in Brooklyn, New York City, to battle the Dark Avengers, help defend Asgard, and aid their comrade Thor. At the same time, the Avengers resistance led by Tigra, Justice, and Gauntlet launch their own attack on Camp H.A.M.M.E.R., aimed at eliminating Osborn's Initiative.

Osborn's people offer Todd Keller, a conservative talk show host, exclusive official coverage of the siege, in order to mold public opinion. Meanwhile, longtime investigative journalist Ben Urich, editor of the New York City newspaper The Front Line, heads to the Oklahoma battle site with cameraman Will Stern. Volstagg, whom they meet in a chance encounter along the way, accompanies them and gives the reporters his own perspective.

As the battle in Asgard intensifies, the Olympian warrior Ares, whom Osborn had deceptively recruited to his Dark Avengers, realizes the truth about Osborn and vows to kill him. Osborn has the Sentry kill Ares instead. Osborn declares martial law just as Rogers and a contingent of Avengers arrives. Volstagg, with the aid of a local sheriff who is suspicious of Osborn, speaks to the public from a webcam video. This leads to the beginning of public disenchantment with the increasingly volatile Osborn.

The siege continues with the super-villain Scourge using the enchanted spear of Asgard's ruler, Odin, to sever the left limbs of the superhero U.S. Agent. The conflicted hero Night Thrasher who had been compelled to make a Faustian bargain with Osborn, turns on him by battling his Cabal minion the Hood. In Washington, the President orders the Secretary of State to dispatch military forces to Oklahoma to have Osborn and the Dark Avengers arrested for treason. At that moment in Asgard, Osborn is struck down by Captain America's shield, yet manages to order the Sentry to destroy the infrastructure of Asgard. Sentry, having survived a flurry of brutal blows from Thor, unscathed and on the verge of tearing Thor apart, transforms into the Void (which greatly multiplies his power to evolved heights) and leaves Thor. He then annihilates Asgard bringing it crashing down to Earth. Rogers finds Osborn in the wreckage and places him under arrest. Before anyone can react further, Osborn's armor, now under the control of its original inventor, Tony Stark explodes off his body on live television, revealing his face painted in the image of the Green Goblin. He begins raving that now that he is powerless, he no longer has the leverage to control the Sentry, who is now fully possessed by his nihilistic other self, the Void. Osborn is convinced that the Void is, in fact, the Angel of Death.

As the Void battles the Avengers, Loki repents and begs Odin to let him use the mystical Norn Stones to give the heroes the strength to win the day. The Void, realizing that the heroes' enhanced power is being granted to them by Loki, kills him. Spurred on by Loki's sacrifice, Thor, and the others battle the Void to the point that it reverts to the Sentry's human form. The Sentry begs the heroes to kill him, and Thor regretfully complies, striking the Sentry down with a lightning blast that leaves only a charred skeleton. As Thor takes the Sentry's body to the sun, the New Avengers round up the Dark Avengers (with the exception of Daken, who managed to escape unnoticed). Victoria Hand, the renegade members of the Initiative, the remaining members of the Cabal, and others, are placed under arrest. Rogers gives his former partner, Bucky Barnes, his Captain America shield, passing him the mantle.

As the Avengers and their allies celebrate their victory at Stark Tower, the Superhuman Registration Act is abolished and Thor and his fellow Asgardian warriors offer an alliance with Earth, creating a portal to Asgard atop Stark Tower. The President asks Rogers to take over Osborn's position. A large group of heroes later attend the Sentry's memorial service. Rogers says that he will continue the 50 State Initiative and reform the original Avengers group with Bucky (as Captain America), Stark and Thor as its main members. He also assigns Victoria Hand to work with the New Avengers. U.S. Agent is made warden of the maximum security super-villain prison The Raft.

What If?
In the special "What if..." series, the story "What if Osborn won the Siege of Asgard" is told. Ares gives in to his intuition before the Siege of Asgard, attacking Osborn in his own office after realizing Osborn lied to him. Sentry murders Ares on the spot allowing him to rest up between battles and to head into battle fully powered. In turn, this leads to him being able to kill Thor as well as Captain America. Most of the heroes present are subsequently slaughtered by the Dark Avengers. Doom has himself and Emma Frost teleported out of the battle and comes up with a new strategy. The new strategy has Emma scan the Dark Avengers and find out the truth about Lindy's death. Bullseye is found out, and Emma shows Sentry the truth of what happens, with catastrophic results. Sentry's fragile psyche is shattered entirely, and he goes on a murderous rampage, killing both Frost and Bullseye, before transforming into a fully powered Void, who then kills Doom, Taskmaster, and the Hood. He then confronts Osborn and thanks him for releasing him, only to kill him too. In the end, with the Avengers, Dark Avengers, and the Gods all defeated, none is left to fight the Void and he eventually consumes Earth entirely, before spreading out to the rest of the universe.

Reception
 The first issue received a rating of 5.9 out of 10 from Comic Book Roundup. and a rating of 7.9 out of 10 from IGN.
 The second issue received a 6.6 out of 10 from Comic Book Roundup. and a rating of 7.4 out of 10 from IGN.
 The third issue received a 7.5 rating out of 10 from Comic Book Roundup. and a rating of 7.2 out of 10 from IGN.
 The fourth issue received a 6.2 rating out of 10 from Comic Book Roundup. and a rating of 6.9 out of 10 from IGN.

Collected editions
Comics in the storyline have been collected into individual trade paperback volumes:

 Siege Prelude (collects Dark Avengers #1, Dark Reign: The Cabal, Thor #600, Dark Reign: The List - Avengers, New Avengers Annual #3, Dark Reign: The Goblin Legacy, and Marvel Spotlight #30, 264 pages, Marvel Comics, softcover, January 2010)
 Siege (148 pages, Panini, May 2010)
 Siege (collects Siege #1-4, Siege: The Cabal, and Siege Digital Prologue, 144 pages, hardcover, August 2010)
 Siege (collects Siege: The Cabal, Siege #1-4, and Avengers: The Way Things are, Marvel Comics, softcover, 2010)
 Siege: X-Men - Dark Wolverine & New Mutants (collects Dark Wolverine #82-84, New Mutants #11, and Siege: Storming Asgard - Heroes & Villains, 128 pages, Marvel Comics, premiere hardcover, August 2010)
 Siege: Embedded (collects Siege: Embedded #1-4, 112 pages, premiere hardcover, August 2010)
 Siege: Battlefield (collects Siege: Spider-Man, Siege: Young Avengers, Siege: Loki, Siege: Captain America, and Siege: Secret Warriors, 120 pages, premiere hardcover, August 2010)
 Siege: New Avengers (collects New Avengers #61-64, New Avengers Annual #3, The List - New Avengers, and New Avengers Finale, 192 pages, premiere hardcover, September 2010)
 Siege: Avengers - The Initiative (collects Avengers: The Initiative #31-35, 120 pages, Marvel Comics, premiere hardcover, September 2010)
 Siege: Thunderbolts (collects Thunderbolts #138-143, 144 pages, premiere hardcover, September 2010)
 Siege: Thor (collects Thor #607-610, "New Mutants" #11 and "Siege: Loki", 144 pages, September 2010)
 Siege: Mighty Avengers (collects Mighty Avengers #32-36, 120 pages, premiere hardcover, October 2010)
 Dark Avengers: Siege (collects Dark Avengers #13-16, and Dark Avengers Annual'', 144 pages, Marvel Comics, premiere hardcover, October 2010)

References

External links
 Read the SIEGE Digital Prologue for FREE!, Marvel.com, December 29, 2009
 
 
 

Fictional sieges
Thor (Marvel Comics)
Comics by Brian Michael Bendis
Green Goblin
Prejudice in fiction